Hughes Creek is a stream in the U.S. state of West Virginia.

Hughes Creek most likely was named after Robert Hughes, a local pioneer who was kidnapped by Indians.

See also
List of rivers of West Virginia

References

Rivers of Kanawha County, West Virginia
Rivers of West Virginia